Indy Zeb Boonen (born 4 January 1999) is a Belgian professional footballer who plays as a winger for Oostende in the Belgian First Division A.

Club career
Boonen began his career with Genk but was released in the summer of 2014. He signed a three-year contract with English club Manchester United as a 16-year-old in February 2015. He trained with the first team on occasion, but rejected the club's offer of a new contract in 2018 and left to return to Belgium with K.V. Oostende that June. He made his professional debut for Oostende in a 2–1 Belgian First Division A win over Royal Excel Mouscron on 28 July 2018, coming on as an injury-time substitute for Richairo Živković. He scored his first professional goal in a 1–1 draw away to S.V. Zulte Waregem on 1 December 2018. He finished the season with a total of three goals in 24 league appearances for the club.

Personal life
Boonen is the son of former professional footballer Jacky Boonen. His brother Seppe is also a footballer, who currently plays for K. Patro Eisden Maasmechelen. Like Indy, Seppe spent time in Manchester United's youth academy. Seppe began his career as a goalkeeper, but has since changed to being a forward.

References

External links
 
 

1999 births
Living people
People from Dilsen-Stokkem
Footballers from Limburg (Belgium)
Belgian footballers
Belgian expatriate footballers
Belgium youth international footballers
K.R.C. Genk players
Manchester United F.C. players
K.V. Oostende players
Belgian Pro League players
Association football wingers
Expatriate footballers in England
Belgian expatriate sportspeople in England